Robert Alan Jennings (born 28 February 1977) is a former English cricketer.  Jennings was a right-handed batsman who played primarily as a wicketkeeper.  He was born in Bristol.

Jennings represented the Gloucestershire Cricket Board in a single List A match against Huntingdonshire in the 1st round of the 2002 Cheltenham & Gloucester Trophy which was held in 2001.  In his only List A match, he scored an unbeaten 12 runs and took a single catch behind the stumps.

References

External links
Robert Jennings at Cricinfo
Robert Jennings at CricketArchive

1977 births
Living people
Cricketers from Bristol
English cricketers
Gloucestershire Cricket Board cricketers
Wicket-keepers